The lowland ringtail possum (Pseudochirulus canescens) is a species of marsupial in the family Pseudocheiridae. It is found in Indonesia, the Solomon Islands, and Papua New Guinea.

References

Possums
Mammals of Papua New Guinea
Mammals of Western New Guinea
Mammals described in 1846
Taxonomy articles created by Polbot
Marsupials of New Guinea